Sariska (foaled 14 February 2006, in England) is a British Thoroughbred racehorse. The horse is best known for her win in The Oaks in 2009, a year in which she was named European Champion 3-Y-O Filly.

Background
Bred and raced by Lady Bamford, she was named for the Sariska Tiger Reserve in the Alwar district of the Indian state of Rajasthan. She was trained by Michael Bell.

Racing career
Sariska made her racing debut on 1 November 2008, winning a maiden race for fillies at Newmarket Racecourse. She did not return to the track until 18 April 2009, when she ran fourth to winner Lahaleeb in the Fred Darling Stakes at Newbury Racecourse. In her next start, Sariska won the Musidora Stakes at York Racecourse. Made the betting favourite for The Oaks, under jockey Jamie Spencer, who had ridden her in all of her previous starts, Sariska outfought Midday down the stretch to win the Classic by a short head.

She followed that up with another victory in the Irish Oaks. Her next start was her first against older horses in the Yorkshire Oaks where she went off a short priced favourite only to be out battled by the four-year-old Dar Re Mi, who prevailed by a short head. She then finished third behind Twice Over in her first race against the colts in the Champion Stakes at Newmarket.

Sariska trained on as a four-year old and started her campaign with an easy victory over old rival Midday in the Group Two Middleton Stakes at York. She was then second in Epsom's Group One Coronation Cup, behind Fame and Glory. In the Yorkshire Oaks, Sariska was to face Midday and a younger horse, that season's dual Oaks winner, Snow Fairy. However, Sariska refused to budge from the stalls as the field raced away from her with Midday, a horse she'd beaten three times, winning. This was the first time Sariska had shown any negative temperament in public, although she had nearly killed her trainer Michael Bell a month previously when kicking him with both hooves in the back, narrowly missing his kidneys and sending him flying across the stable.

Retirement
Connections gave her one last chance in the Prix Vermeille at Longchamp, but she again refused to budge from the stalls in a race where Midday again took the honours. After the race, her trainer Michael Bell compared her to "a Ferrari with no keys" due to her appearing to be "in great form" but refusing to run. Sariska was then retired. She is currently a broodmare at Daylesford Stud and was bred to Galileo in 2011 for a 2012 foal.

Stud Record

 2013 Snow Moon (GB) : Bay filly, foaled 25 February, by Oasis Dream (GB) - won once and placed third from 2 starts to date in England 2015-16.
 2015 Foaled a colt by Frankel (GB)
 2016 Covered by Dubawi (IRE)

Pedigree

References

 Sariska's pedigree and partial racing stats
 Video at YouTube of Sariska winning the 2009 Epsom Oaks

2006 racehorse births
Racehorses bred in the United Kingdom
Racehorses trained in the United Kingdom
Cartier Award winners
Irish Classic Race winners
Thoroughbred family 6-e
Epsom Oaks winners